Yazid Yasin is a retired Singapore footballer who played most of his career in S.League

He is one of a rare handful of players who had won every single title available in the domestic league since its inauguration in 1996.

Club career
As a youth player, Yazid first came to prominence in the 1995 Lion City Cup where he stood in goal for eventual winners, the Singapore A (Under-16) squad, alongside Indra Sahdan and Ahmad Latiff Khamaruddin.

His level headed performance as a 16-year-old in the competition led to him signing his first professional contract with Sembawang Rangers in the S.League's maiden season in 1996. During his time with the Stallions, he was once famously deployed as a midfielder in a 1996 S.League match against Woodlands Wellington due to an injury crisis in the Sembawang squad.

In 1999, he moved to Home United and won the S.League title with the Protectors in the same year. He was also named as the Young Player of The Year in 1999.

He has also won the Singapore Cup twice with Home United in 2000 and Geylang United in 2009, as well as the Singapore League Cup with Woodlands Wellington in 2007.

Yazid's performance during the 2009 RHB Singapore Cup, which included a penalty save late in the game, won him the man of the match award and helped Geylang United to lift the Cup after a hard-fought 1–0 victory over Thai Premier League side Bangkok Glass in the final. The following season, Yazid appeared in the Eagles' AFC Cup matches against V-League champions, Da Nang, and Hong Kong FA Cup winners, Tai Po FC.

On 19 November 2012, it was announced that Yazid Yasin had re-joined his former club, Woodlands Wellington. He is the player with the fourth most number of appearances for the Rams at 124 appearances behind Abdelhadi Laakkad (129 appearances), Goh Tat Chuan (138 appearances) and current record holder Sazali Salleh (158 appearances).

He made his first reappearance and his 125th overall appearance for Woodlands Wellington on 21 February 2013 in a 2–2 draw against Warriors F.C.

The 34-year-old achieved a milestone on July 16 when he made an incredible 400th S.League appearance in the Rams' 5-2 victory over the Courts Young Lions at the Woodlands Stadium.

After the merger of Woodlands into Hougang United in 2015, Yazid returned to Geylang to join Geylang International FC. At 36 years old, Yazid is S.League's oldest active player.

Club career statistics

Yazid Yasin's Profile

All numbers encased in brackets signify substitute appearances.

International career

Yazid has one solitary cap for Singapore, which he acquired while playing for the Lions in a friendly match against New Zealand on 29 June 1999.

International Appearances

References

External links

1979 births
Living people
Singaporean footballers
Singapore international footballers
Geylang International FC players
Home United FC players
Woodlands Wellington FC players
Sembawang Rangers FC players
Singapore Premier League players
Association football goalkeepers
Singaporean people of Malay descent
Gymkhana FC players